Vitalie Grijuc (born 11 January 1994) is a Moldavian football defender who played in the Moldovan National Division for FC Zaria Bălți.

Club statistics
Total matches played in Moldavian First League: 59 matches - 0 goal

References

External links
 

1994 births
Moldovan footballers
Living people
Association football defenders
CSF Bălți players